Matthew Dow Smith (sometimes credited as Matthew Smith) is an American comic book artist.

Bibliography 
 Astronauts in Trouble: Live From the Moon #1 and #2
 Bad Luck Chuck #1-5 (Dark Horse)
 The Book of Fate #11
 Day of Judgment #1-5
 Dead Kings #1-4 (Aftershock)
 Deathlok #6
 Doctor Who (ongoing series) #3-6 (2009)
 Generation X #62
 Hellboy: Box Full of Evil
 The Keep #1-5
 Mirror's Edge #1
 Negative Burn #1
 Nightcrawler (Vol 2, 2002) #1-4
 The October Girl (2012, writer and artist)
 The Path #9-10,13-17,19-20
 Randy Bowen's Decapitator #3
 Sandman Mystery Theatre #45-48
 Sentinels of Magic
 Shock the Monkey #2
 Showcase '96 #4-5
 Starman #11 (vol 2, 1995) & #42 (vol 2, 1998)
 Stormwatch: Post Human Division #5 (with Christos Gage, 2007, Wildstorm, collected in Stormwatch: Post Human Division Volume 2, 144 pages, April 2008)
 Supernatural: Origins
 Supreme: The Return #3-4
 Timeslip: The Coming of the Avengers #1
 Uncanny X-Men #400

See also 
 List of American comics creators

Notes

References

External links
Blog

Living people
Year of birth missing (living people)